Paul Degen (24 March 1941 – 30 May 2007) was a Swiss illustrator, caricaturist, painter and sculptor. He is mostly known for the cartoons he did for The New York Times and his 34 title illustrations for The New Yorker magazine in the 1970s and 1980s. In 1992 he was awarded the Basel Innovation Prize for inventing the "ROMA birth wheel."

Biography

Early life and education 
Paul Degen was born on 24 March 1941 in Basel, Switzerland. After his education as a lithographor at the Wassermann Ag in Basel and graduation from the Kunstschule Basel (Basel College of Commercial Art), Degen continued his education at the graphic design studio of Theo Ballmer and at the Académie Julian in Paris.

Career 
In the 1960s Degen worked as a freelance graphic designer and illustrator with Herbert Leupin, Celestino Piatti, and Fritz Bühler at the Atelier Eidenbenz in Switzerland.

In 1970 he moved to New York and worked, besides freelancing as a cartoonist and illustrator for The New York Times, Esquire, Harper's Magazine and The Atlantic Monthly, at the Push Pin Studios with Milton Glaser and Seymour Chwast.

After living in Brasil, Peru, Hawaii, Bali, and his return to New York at the end of 1988, Degen moved back to Liestal near Basel in 1990.

ROMA Birth Wheel 
In the mid-1980s, while hospitalized for a spinal disc herniation, Degan suffered from chronic constipation and the helplessness of being forced to lie on his back. Obsessing about the desire to be upright and hold onto something, he realized that women in labor must have the same desires. While still bedridden, Degan produced initial drawings which six years later led to the first ROMA Birth Wheel. The device allows women in labor to achieve an upright, natural position for delivery of the child.

Death 
Paul Degen died on May 30, 2007, in Basel following an operation.

Exhibitions
 Architecture for Children (1000 boxes), Hudson River Museum, New York
 34 American Architects Travelling Exhibit - Rome, Venice, Milan, Bologna and the United States
 1979 - Gallerie Commercio, Zurich
 1979/81 - Hotel Engel, Liestal
 1981 - Susumo Gallery, Sydney
 1985 - Hotel Engel, Liestal
 2006 - HP-GARCIA Gallery, Hell´s Kitchen/ New York

Book illustrations
 The Emperor's New Clothes, Hans Christian Andersen, Random House (1978), 
 O Thou Improper Thou Uncommun Noun, Clarkson N Potter Inc, NY (1978), 
 David Copperfield, Charles Dickens, Franklin Library (1980), ASIN: B000BWRFP0
Die Abenteuer der 3 T Buch:Ingrid Tschan, Illustrationen: Paul Degen

Notes

References
Degen entry, German Wikipedia
Degen page at ROMA Birth official site

External links
 Degen illustration samples and unpublished New Yorker covers at Stigma7

Swiss illustrators
20th-century Swiss painters
Swiss male painters
21st-century Swiss painters
21st-century Swiss male artists
Swiss cartoonists
20th-century Swiss inventors
1941 births
2007 deaths
The New Yorker cartoonists
20th-century Swiss sculptors
20th-century Swiss male artists